Dorian Baxter (born 3 April 1950) is a Canadian religious minister and musician and a perennial candidate for political office in Newmarket, Ontario, Canada. He was consecrated as an bishop in the Federation of Independent Anglican Churches in 2003.

Ministry
In 1996, Baxter began incorporating the music and look of Elvis Presley into his services. That year, he won the Canadian Showstopper at the Collingwood Elvis Festival. In 1997 he won the Grand Champion of Showstoppers at that same festival. After that year, festival founder Billy Cann was ousted and control given to the town's business groups, a decision which Baxter objected to before Collingwood Town Council. Baxter joined Cann to establish a competing Elvis festival in Orillia and refused to return to the Collingwood festival.

In 2002, the church revoked his invitation to be the keynote preacher at a Masonic service in a Toronto Anglican church (although he did eventually attend). Baxter has said he found this particularly difficult, as he has been a Freemason for more than 25 years.

In 2003, he set up an independent church, Christ the King Graceland Independent Anglican Church of Canada, in Newmarket, Ontario, where he continues to conduct services using Presley's music, with his signature Elvis pompadour and sideburns. Baxter was consecrated on 9 March 2003 in Newmarket by the Rt. Rev'd Christopher Andrew Jukes of Calgary, Alberta, who at that time was a bishop in the Communion of Evangelical Episcopal Churches, using the traditional ordinal of the Book of Common Prayer (1962 Canada). He also established the Federation of Independent Anglican Churches of North America with himself as self-styled archbishop; this organisation was incorporated by Federal Canadian Letters Patent on 1 October 2003.

Political life

Baxter has run for federal Parliament four times in the riding of Newmarket-Aurora, under the Progressive Canadian Party banner. In the 2004 federal election, he received 1,079 votes, placing last out of five candidates. In the 2006 election he received 729 votes, and in the 2008 election he received 1,004 votes. He placed fifth out of six candidates in both 2006 and 2008. In the 2011 election, he received 1,001 votes, placing fifth out of six candidates, surpassing only Yvonne Mackie of the Animal Alliance Environment party. Baxter also ran in the 2010 by-election in the riding of Vaughan, finishing seventh of out eight candidates with 110 votes. He ran in the by-election for Markham—Thornhill on 3 April 2017, placing fourth out of seven candidates.

He founded NAPPA (The National Association for Public and Private Accountability) on the heels of his successful lawsuit against the Durham Region Children's Aid society.  (See judgement by Justice Somers, 22 March 1994.  Baxter versus Durham Region Children's Aid Society).

Electoral record

Federal

Provincial

Municipal

See also
 Elvis impersonator

References

External links
 Christ the King Graceland

1950 births
Living people
Canadian Anglican priests
Progressive Canadian Party candidates in the 2004 Canadian federal election
Progressive Canadian Party candidates in the 2006 Canadian federal election
Kenyan emigrants to Canada
University of Toronto alumni
York University alumni
Canadian federal political party presidents
Elvis impersonators